Francis William Drummond Quinton (27 November 1865 – 5 December 1926) was an English first-class cricketer. Quinton was a right-handed batsman who bowled slow underarm.

Quinton made his first-class debut for CI Thornton's England XI in 1885 against Cambridge University.

In 1893 Quinton made his debut for the Marylebone Cricket Club against Oxford University. In 1894 Quinton played in the same fixture. In 1895 Quinton played a single first-class match for West in the East v West at the United Services Recreation Ground in Portsmouth.

In 1895 Quinton made his debut for Hampshire against Yorkshire. From 1895 to 1900 Quinton played 45 matches for Hampshire, the last of which came against Leicestershire. In his 45 matches for Hampshire, Quinton made 2,178 runs at an average of 28.28, with a high score of 178 against Leicestershire in 1895. That score was one of two centuries Quinton made, as well as fourteen half centuries. Quinton was also a useful underarm bowler, who was one of the last proponents of that bowling form. His bowling yielded 30 wickets at an average of 28.50, with best bowling figures of 5/93 against Derbyshire in 1898. Quinton was also an able fielder, taking 45 catches.

Quinton died in Marylebone, London on 5 December 1926.

Family
Quinton's brother, James Quinton, also represented Hampshire in first-class cricket. Quinton played alongside James in two matches against Sussex and Yorkshire. In the report of the inquest into his brother's suicide in 1922, Quinton is identified as "Brigadier-General Francis Quinton".

References

External links
Francis Quinton at Cricinfo
Francis Quinton at CricketArchive
Matches and detailed statistics for Francis Quinton

1865 births
1926 deaths
People from Faizabad
English cricketers
Marylebone Cricket Club cricketers
Hampshire cricketers
West of England cricketers
C. I. Thornton's XI cricketers
Royal Artillery officers
British Army generals of World War I
Companions of the Order of the Indian Empire